Saint-Léger-les-Vignes is a commune in the Loire-Atlantique department in western France.

See also
Communes of the Loire-Atlantique department

References

Saintlegerlesvignes